The 2010 UCI Cyclo-cross World Championships took place in Tábor, Czech Republic on the weekend of January 30 and 31, 2010. As in 2009, four events were scheduled.

Schedule 

 Saturday, 30 January 2010:
 11h00 Men's Junior
 14h00 Men's Under-23
 Sunday, 31 January 2010:
 11h00 Women's Elite
 14h00 Men's Elite

Medal table

Medal summary

External links

 Result list - Men Juniors
 Result list - Men Under-23

 
Uci Cyclo-cross World Championships, 2010
Cyclo-cross
UCI Cyclo-cross World Championships
International cycle races hosted by the Czech Republic
January 2009 sports events in Europe